Chungmok of Goryeo (15 May 1337 – 25 December 1348, r. 1344–1348), born Wang Heun, was the 29th king of the Goryeo dynasty of Korea.

Biography

He was the eldest son of King Chunghye, and his mother was Princess Deoknyeong. Chungmok is known in some records by his Mongolian name, Batma Dorji, which is rendered in hanja as Palsamataaji.

After King Chunghye was deposed in 1343, King Chungmok had an audience with the Yuan Emperor Togon-temür. He was asked whether he would prefer to follow the ways of his mother or his father; when King Chungmok answered that he would prefer to follow his mother, the Emperor said that this was a child who knew the difference between right and wrong, and made him king.

Family
Parents

Father: Wang Jeong, King Chunghye of Goryeo (고려충혜 왕정)(22 February 1315 – 30 January 1344)
Grandfather: Wang Man, King Chungsuk of Goryeo (고려 충숙 왕만)(30 July 1294 – 3 May 1339)
Grandmother: Queen Gongwon of the Namyang Hong clan (공원왕후 홍씨)
Mother: Borjigin Irenchenppan (孛兒只斤 亦憐眞班), Princess Deoknyeong of the Yuan Borjigin clan (덕녕공주 보르지긴씨; d. 1375)
Grandfather: Chopal

In popular culture
Portrayed by Min Byung-hyun in the 2005–2006 MBC TV series Shin Don.

See also
List of Korean monarchs
Goryeo
Korea under Yuan rule

References

 

1337 births
1348 deaths
14th-century Korean monarchs
Korean Buddhist monarchs